The 1959–60 Liga Leumit season took place between September 1959 and June 1960. Hapoel Petah Tikva won their second consecutive title, whilst Hapoel Ramat Gan were relegated. Rafi Levi of Maccabi Tel Aviv was the league's top scorer with 19 goals.

The league used two points for a win and one for a draw.

Final table

Results

References
Israel - List of Final Tables RSSSF

Liga Leumit seasons
Israel
1959–60 in Israeli football leagues